The Chief Cashier of the Bank of England is the person responsible for issuing banknotes at the Bank of England and is the director of the divisions which provide the Bank of England's banking infrastructure.  This person is known to the general public because since 1870 the Chief Cashier's signature is printed on all bank notes issued by the Bank of England. In 2004 a new post was created, Executive Director of Banking & Chief Cashier, incorporating the title.

The post is currently held by Sarah John who was appointed in June 2018. She is the 33rd Chief Cashier since the Bank was founded in 1694.

Responsibilities 
The position has the following responsibilities:
 The security and effective operation of real-time gross settlement in the UK’s high value payment systems (CHAPS and CREST).
 Along with the Bank’s Sterling Markets Division they are also responsible for the provision of liquidity to the market and settlement banks.
 The issuing and effective distribution of banknotes and their security against counterfeiting.
 The provision of banking services, focusing on high-value government banking.

The Executive Director Banking & Chief Cashier is a member of the Governor’s Executive Team which is the Bank’s senior management group.

History 

In 1694 the Bank of England was established. Almost immediately, the Bank started to issue notes in return for deposits.  The crucial feature that made Bank of England notes a means of exchange was the promise to pay the bearer the sum of the note on demand. This meant that the note could be redeemed at the Bank for gold or coinage by anyone presenting it for payment. If it was not redeemed in full, it was endorsed with the amount withdrawn. These notes were initially handwritten on Bank paper and signed by one of the Bank’s cashiers. 

During the 18th century there was a gradual move towards fixed denomination notes. In 1725 the Bank started issuing partly printed notes for completion in manuscript. The £ sign and the first digit were printed but the cashier’s signature along with the name of the payee and other numerals were added by hand.

The first fully printed notes appeared in 1855 relieving the cashiers of the task of filling in the name of the payee and signing each note individually. The practice of writing the name of the Chief Cashier as the payee on notes was halted in favour of the anonymous "I promise to pay the bearer on demand the sum of …", a feature that has remained unchanged on notes to this day. The printed signature on the note continued to be that of one of three cashiers until 1870; since then it has always been that of the Chief Cashier. The Bank of England notes on its website that the promise holds "for all time", even after notes have been withdrawn from circulation. This means that every Bank of England note can be exchanged for its face value at any time.

Chief Cashiers of the Bank of England 

Listed below are the names of people who have held the post of Chief Cashier at the Bank of England:

1694–1694: John Kendrick
1694–1699: Thomas Speed
1699–1739: Thomas Madockes
1739–1751: James Collier and Daniel Race (jointly)
1751–1759: Daniel Race and Elias Simes (jointly)
1759–1775: Daniel Race
1775–1777: Charles Jewson
1778–1807: Abraham Newland
1807–1829: Henry Hase
1829–1835: Thomas Rippon
1835–1864: Matthew Marshall
1864–1866: William Miller
1866–1873: George Forbes
1873–1893: Frank May
1893–1902: Horace Bowen
1902–1918: Sir John Gordon Nairne, 1st Baronet
1918–1925: Ernest Musgrave Harvey
1925–1929: Cyril Patrick Mahon
1929–1934: Basil G. Catterns
1934–1949: Kenneth Peppiatt
1949–1955: Percival Beale
1955–1962: Leslie O'Brien
1962–1966: Jasper Hollom
1966–1970: John Standish Fforde
1970–1980: John Page
1980–1988: David Somerset
1988–1991: Malcolm Gill
1991–1998: Graham Kentfield
1999–2003: Merlyn Lowther
2004–2011: Andrew Bailey
2011–2014: Chris Salmon
2014–2018: Victoria Cleland
2018–present: Sarah John

See also

Deputy Governor of the Bank of England
Governor of the Bank of England

References

Bank of England